Pritchard Mpelele (born 16 June 1995) is a Zimbabwean football striker whoc currently plays for Manica Diamonds.

References

1995 births
Living people
Zimbabwean footballers
Hwange Colliery F.C. players
Harare City F.C. players
Manica Diamonds F.C. players
Zimbabwe international footballers
Association football forwards
People from Matabeleland North Province
Zimbabwe Premier Soccer League players